The Morkoka (Morkuoka) is a river in Sakha Republic, Russia. It is a right tributary of the Markha. The river sources from Lake Bayyttakh and travels through the Vilyuy Plateau.

References

Rivers of the Sakha Republic